Ventriculostomy is a neurosurgical procedure that involves creating a hole (stoma) within a cerebral ventricle for drainage. It is most commonly performed on those with hydrocephalus. It is done by surgically penetrating the skull, dura mater, and brain such that the ventricular system ventricle of the brain is accessed. When catheter drainage is temporary, it is commonly referred to as an external ventricular drain (EVD). When catheter drainage is permanent, it is usually referred to as a shunt. There are many catheter-based ventricular shunts that are named for where they terminate, for example, a ventriculi-peritoneal shunt terminates in the peritoneal cavity, a ventriculoarterial shunt terminates within the atrium of the heart, etc. The most common entry point on the skull is called Kocher's point, which is measured 11 cm posterior to the nasion and 3 cm lateral to midline. EVD ventriculostomy is done primarily to monitor the intracranial pressure as well as to drain  cerebrospinal fluid (CSF), primarily, or blood to relieve pressure from the central nervous system (CNS).

Strictly speaking, "ventriculostomy" does not require the use of tubing. For example, a "third ventriculostomy" is a neurosurgical procedure that creates a hole in the floor of the third ventricle and usually has no indwelling objects.Other types of ventriculostomy include ventriculocisternostomy developed by the Norwegian doctor Arne Torkildsen.

See also 
 List of surgeries by type
 External ventricular drain

References

Neurosurgical procedures
Ventricular system